Eadwulf, Earl of Bernicia may refer to:
Eadwulf II of Northumbria or Eadwulf I of Bamburgh (d. 913)
Eadwulf Evil-child or Eadwulf II of Bamburgh (fl. c.969)
Eadwulf Cudel or Eadwulf III of Bamburgh (fl. c. 1018)
Eadwulf IV of Bamburgh (d. 1041)